Jonathan Alexandersohn (born about the beginning of the 19th century, Grätz in Posen, then Germany - November 24, 1869, Altofen, Kingdom of Hungary, Austrian Empire) was a German-Hungarian rabbi.

About 1830 he was rabbi in Schwerin-on-the-Warthe, whence he removed to Hungary. His violent temper soon made him many enemies. He pronounced a decree of divorce which brought upon him the enmity of the rabbi of Szántó, Eleazar Löw, whose contention was that no divorce had ever been pronounced in Csaba, because of the uncertainty of the Hebrew transliteration of the name, and therefore it was not lawful to grant a divorce in this place. Alexandersohn's enemies were encouraged by this contention to bring charges against him, and prevailed upon Löw to try him for heresy and for violations of the dietary and ritual laws. He was accused of disbelieving in a hereafter; of saying that he would take a lenient view in all legal questions; of sleeping bareheaded; of walking four cubits from his bed without washing his hands; and of other violations of Jewish rites. In 1835 a court, composed of three rabbis, declared him unworthy of the rabbinical office.

Moses Sofer, chief rabbi of Pozsony (Pressburg), and Moses Teitelbaum, rabbi of Újhely, the leader of the Hasidim in Hungary, confirmed this decision. Alexandersohn appealed to the civil courts in vain; but Solomon Rosenthal, a prominent member of the congregation in Budapest, and his old friend Götz Kohn of Schwerin, took up his case, and appointed a committee of five rabbis to consider it. The committee cleared him of all charges, and ordered the congregation to pay him 800 florins in damages. Alexandersohn would not accept this indemnity, but demanded to be reinstated in his office. He brought other lawsuits against the congregation, and traveled through Germany, Belgium, France, England, and Italy in order to interest other rabbis and laymen in his behalf. Among those who defended him was Zecharias Frankel, then rabbi of Dresden, who addressed a letter to Moses Sofer, urging the latter to rescind his decision. All these efforts were unsuccessful, and in 1846 Alexandersohn published, in German and Hebrew, the documents relating to his case. He was finally reduced to beggary and thrown on public charity for his support, living the life of a tramp.

He died in the Jewish hospital of Altofen on November 24, 1869.

References

 Jewish Encyclopedia Bibliography
J. Alexandersohn, Ehrenrettung und auf Dokumente Gestützte Widerlegung, etc., Dessau, 1846 (the Hebrew part of this work, with the title  was printed in Berlin in 1845)
Rabbi Isaak Markus Jost, Annalen, 1840, No. 9 et seq.
L. Münz, Rabbi Eleazar Genannt Schemen Rokeach, pp. 131 et seq., Treves, 1895
S. Kohn, in Magyar Zsidó Szemle, 1898, pp. 316-325, and 1899, pp. 17-29

19th-century Hungarian people
19th-century German rabbis
Hungarian rabbis
Hungarian people of German descent
People from Grodzisk Wielkopolski
People from Skwierzyna
People from Miskolc
People from Óbuda
19th-century births
1869 deaths